A plastomer is a polymer material which combines qualities of elastomers and plastics, such as rubber-like properties with the processing ability of plastic.  As such, the word plastomer is a portmanteau of the words plastic and elastomer.  Significant plastomers are ethylene-alpha olefin copolymers.

References

Polymers